Alborada may refer to:
 Aubade, a song or poem concerning daybreak (alborada in Spanish)
 Alborada (TV series), a Mexican telenovela
 Alborada (horse) a British thoroughbred racehorse
 Alborada (film), a multilingual Sri Lankan film by Asoka Handagama about the life of Pablo Neruda

See also
 "Alborada del gracioso", a piece for solo piano by Maurice Ravel